This is a wide-ranging, inclusive list of percussion instruments.

It includes:
 Instruments classified by Hornbostel–Sachs as struck or friction idiophones, struck or friction membranophones or struck chordophones. Where an instrument meets this definition but is often or traditionally excluded from the term percussion this is noted.
 Instruments commonly used as unpitched and/or untuned percussion.
 Instruments commonly part of the percussion section of a band or orchestra.
These three groups overlap heavily, but inclusion in any one is sufficient for an instrument to be included in this list. However, when only a specific subtype of the instrument qualifies as a percussion instrument, only that subtype is listed here. For example, a samba whistle (or apito) is an unpitched percussion instrument, but a whistle in general is not.

For brevity, synonyms represented in Wikipedia by redirects to a main article are not listed, but may be mentioned as a note. Only the main article names are listed in these cases. For example, apito is listed but samba whistle is merely noted as an alternate name. A distinct instrument or type represented only by a redirect to an article section should however be shown. Instruments represented only by redlinks have no Wikipedia articles as yet but are shown.

See list of percussion instruments by type for some shorter, more focused lists. Use the sorting arrows on the common usage column to group instruments as pitched, unpitched or both. Use the sorting arrows on the Classification column to group instruments according to their Hornbostel–Sachs classification.

Percussion instruments

See also

Top-level articles
 Percussion instrument
 List of percussion instruments by type
 Classification of percussion instruments

Subgroups of percussion instruments
 Membranophone
 Idiophone
 Melodic percussion instrument
 Mallet percussion
 Keyboard percussion

Categories
Only the more significant subcategories are shown
 :Category:Percussion instruments
 :Category:Membranophones
 :Category:Drums
 :Category:Idiophones
 :Category:Cymbals
 :Category:Pitched percussion instruments
 :Category:Percussion instruments by means of sound production
 :Category:Percussion instruments by playing technique
 :Category:Percussion instruments by usage

References

 
Articles containing video clips
Lists of musical instruments